The Kerala Story is an upcoming Indian Hindi-language film written and directed by Sudipto Sen. The film courted controversy after its teaser mounted claims about thousands of girls from Kerala being converted to Islam for recruitment to the Islamic State of Iraq and Syria (ISIS). The film stars Adah Sharma.

Background
The teaser features one Fathima Ba — a Hindu Malayali nurse —  who had converted to Islam and joined the ISIS, before ending up in an Afghan jail. She claims to be one of the 32,000 girls, from the Hindu and Christian communities, who are "missing" from Kerala and have been recruited to the Islamic State of Iraq and Syria (ISIS) after being converted to Islam. Sen, the director of the film, has made such claims for years; in 2018, he had directed a documentary on the involuntary mass-conversion of 33,000 Hindu and Christian girls to Islam as part of an "international conspiracy" to render Kerala an Islamic state.

The protagonist appears to be based on a real life incident — four women including one Hindu convert, who were part of a 21-member-strong group from Kerala to join ISIS in 2016, remain incarcerated in Afghanistan since surrendering in 2019. However, the claimed figures may be different, being extrapolations from misrepresentations of unrelated statistics. Experts from the Observer Research Foundation note that less than 200 Indians had joined ISIS and Kerala, having over nine million Muslims, accounts for less than a quarter.

Both Indian National Congress and Communist Party of India (Marxist) — the only two parties to have governed the state since Independence — have objected to the release of the film for propagating communal misinformation.

Cast
 Adah Sharma as Shalini Unnikrishnan / Fatima Ba

References 

2022 films
Upcoming Hindi-language films
2020s Hindi-language films
Hindi-language drama films
Hindi-language films based on actual events
Films about missing people
Films about human trafficking in India
Films about Islamic terrorism
Films about jihadism
Films about Islamic State of Iraq and the Levant
Films about terrorism in Asia